"If You Can't Do It When You're Young; When Can You Do It?" is a song recorded by British band Theaudience for their debut album, Theaudience. It was released as the album's second single on 23 February 1998, peaking at #48 on the UK Singles Chart. The B-sides for the single include "You & Me on the Run", a song composed by Billy Reeves & Tim Mollett, "The Beginning, The Middle & The End", and "There Are Worse Things I Could Do", a cover from the soundtrack of the film Grease.

Track listing
 UK CD single (AUDCD2)
 "If You Can't Do It When You're Young; When Can You Do It?" – 3:54
 "There Are Worse Things I Could Do" – 2:21
 "You & Me on the Run" – 3:22
 "The Beginning, The Middle & The End" – 8:19

 UK Limited Edition Vinyl (AUDVN2)
 "If You Can't Do It When You You're Young; When Can You Do It?" – 3:54
 "There Are Worse Things I Could Do" – 2:21

References

1998 singles
Theaudience songs
Mercury Records singles
Songs written by Billy Reeves